Concetta DiRusso is an American scientist and Professor of Biochemistry.  She is best known for her work on transcriptional regulation of fatty acid metabolism in bacteria.

Biography 
DiRusso received her B.A. from Hampshire College, and in 1982 she completed her Ph.D. in cell and molecular biology from the University of Vermont.  She is currently on the faculty of the University of Nebraska-Lincoln where she holds the position of Professor of Biochemistry.  In 2015, she was invested with the George W. Holmes University Professorship.  DiRusso is a Fellow of the American Association for the Advancement of Science.  In 2014, she served as Jefferson Science Fellow in the Global Health Bureau of the United States Agency for International Development.

References

Living people
University of Vermont alumni
University of Nebraska faculty
Jefferson Science Fellows
Year of birth missing (living people)
Hampshire College alumni